The 2007 Croatia Open Umag was the 18th edition of the Croatia Open Umag men's tennis tournament. The tournament was held from 23 July until 29 July 2007 and was part of the 2007 ATP Tour

Carlos Moyà won his first and only title of the year and his 20th and final career title overall. Moyà won four times previously, making him one of only eight men to have won five titles at a single event in the open era.

Finals

Singles

 Carlos Moyà defeated  Andrei Pavel, 6–4, 6–2

Doubles

 Lukáš Dlouhý /  Michal Mertiňák defeated  Jaroslav Levinský /  David Škoch, 6–1, 6–1

References

External links

 ITF tournament edition details

 
Croatia Open
Croatian Open